A Flea in Her Ear is a 1968 DeLuxe Color 20th Century Fox American/French feature Panavision film adaptation of the 1907 play A Flea in Her Ear by Georges Feydeau in an adaptation (originally written for the stage) by John Mortimer. It was directed by Jacques Charon and the cast included Rex Harrison, Rosemary Harris, Louis Jourdan, and Rachel Roberts.

Plot summary

Gabrielle (Rosemary Harris) is convinced her attorney husband Victor (Rex Harrison) is seeing another woman because of his inattention to her amorous needs. She sets up a meeting with her husband at a shady hotel, and he is completely unaware that the woman he is going to meet will be his own wife.

Cast and crew
 Rex Harrison as Victor Chandebisse/Poche
 Rosemary Harris as Gabrielle Chandebisse
 Louis Jourdan as Henri Tournel
 Rachel Roberts as Suzanne de Castillian 
 John Williams as Dr. Finache
 Edward Hardwicke as Pierre Chandebisse
 Georges Descrières as Don Carlos de Castilian
 Isla Blair as Antoinette, Charles's Wife
 Frank Thornton as Charles the Butler
 Victor Sen Yung as Oke Saki
 Grégoire Aslan as Max, Hotel Coq d'Or Owner
 Olivier Hussenot as Max's Uncle Louis

Reception
According to Fox records the film required $8,450,000 in rentals to break even and by 11 December 1970 had made $2,250,000. In September 1970 the studio announced it had lost $3,736,000 on the film.

See also
 List of American films of 1968

References

External links
 
 
 
 

1968 films
American comedy films
American films based on plays
Films based on works by Georges Feydeau
Films scored by Bronisław Kaper
Films set in the 1900s
Films set in Paris
French comedy films
English-language French films
1968 comedy films
1968 directorial debut films
1960s English-language films
1960s American films
1960s French films